Martyrs' Park Station is a station on Line 1 of the Guangzhou Metro that started operations on 28June 1997. It is located at the under the junction of Zhongshan 3rd Road and Jiaochang Road East in the Yuexiu District of Guangzhou. It is named "Martyrs' Park Station" because of the nearby Guangzhou Martyrs' Memorial Garden or Guangzhou Martyrs' Memorial Cemetery, a park dedicated to those who fought and died in the 1927 Guangzhou Uprising by the Chinese communists against the Kuomintang.

Station layout

Exits

References

Railway stations in China opened in 1997
Guangzhou Metro stations in Yuexiu District